Barbados–Israel relations are the bilateral relations between Barbados and the State of Israel. Barbados has a consul who resides in Tel Aviv and Israel has a honorary consul who resides in Bridgetown. In addition, the Israeli ambassador for the Caribbean area, resides in New York City is accredited for Barbados, and the Barbadian ambassador to London is accredited for Israel.

History
Barbados and Israel established their diplomatic relations a year after the island gained independence from the United Kingdom. In 2014, the manual two countries maintain a lively trade of over 2 million US Dollars. A small number of Barbadian professionals travel to Israel each year for advanced courses in fields such as education, agriculture, and healthcare.

The Jewish community in Barbados, although small, dates from 1654 and is among the oldest in the Americas and the oldest in the Caribbean area. Various activities help maintain the connection between the Jewish community and Israel.

Barbados does not recognize a Palestinian state and has no bilateral ties with the PLO.

See also
 List of Caribbean Jews
 Nidhe Israel Synagogue (Built in 1654 in Bridgetown, Barbados)
 Haiti–Israel relations

References

Israel
Barbados